This is a list of Iranian women, of all Iranian ethnic backgrounds, including both women born in Iran and women that are of the Iranian diaspora.

Nobel laureates 
 Shirin Ebadi (born 1947), 2003 Nobel Laureate (Peace)

Scientists and engineers

Business 

Afsaneh Beschloss, former treasurer of the World Bank, entrepreneur, and investor

Academia

Writers and poets

Actors

Filmmakers and theatre directors

Fine arts

Dance

Design

Fashion design

Journalists

Musicians

Athletes

Politicians

Royalty

Activists

Prisoners and detainees

Models and beauty pageant

Others
 Atousa Pourkashiyan (born 1988), chess grandmaster
 Behnaz Mozakka, died in 7 July 2005 London bombings
 Effat Tejaratchi (1917–1999), first Iranian woman to fly an airplane
 Fateme Asadi (1960 – 1984), first Iranian 'martyr' women whose body was found during post-war explorations.
 Ladan and Laleh Bijani (1974–2003), conjoined twins
 Qudsiyyih Khanum Ashraf (1889–1976), Bahá'i teacher and midwife
 Sahar Khodayari (c.1990–2019), attempted to enter a sporting stadium disguised as a man in March 2019; she died by suicide
 Shadi Paridar (born 1986), chess grandmaster

References

Iranian
+Women
Women